Reaching the Cold 100 is an album recorded by the British blues band the Peter Green Splinter Group, led by Peter Green. Released in 2003, this was their eighth and final album. Green was the founder of Fleetwood Mac and a member of that group from 1967–70, before a sporadic solo career during the late 1970s and early 1980s.
This album is the only charting album by the group, at number 11 on the Billboard Blues album chart in March 2003.

The album was recorded at the Roundel Studios, Kent, England, owned by Roger Cotton who also played on the album and composed some of the tracks.

Track listing
"Ain't Nothin' Gonna Change It" (Roger Cotton) – 3:28
"Look Out for Yourself" (Pete Stroud) – 4:29
"Cool Down" (Owen Parker, Nigel Watson) – 3:59
"Dangerous Man" (Cotton) – 4:06
"Needs Must the Devil Drives" (Parker, Watson) – 4:16
"Must Be a Fool" (Stroud) – 4:33
"Don't Walk Away" (Cotton) – 4:32
"Can You Tell Me Why (a.k.a. Legal Fee Blues)" (Parker, Watson) – 3:49
"Spiritual Thief" (Parker, Watson) – 4:57
"I'm Ready for You" (Stroud) – 4:39
"Smile" (Parker, Watson) – 5:17
"Nice Girl Like You" (Cotton) – 4:36
"When Somebody Cares" (Parker, Watson) – 5:26

Bonus EP (CD 2)

"Black Magic Woman" (Peter Green) – 6:51
"It Takes Time" (Otis Rush) – 5:27
"Green Manalishi" (Green) – 4:43
"Albatross" (Green) – 3:24

Some later versions including digital media (e.g. Eagle Rock version in 2003) do not include the Bonus EP tracks.

Personnel

Peter Green Splinter Group
 Peter Green – guitars, harmonica, vocals
 Nigel Watson – guitar, vocals
 Roger Cotton – guitar, keyboards, Hammond C-3 organ
 Pete Stroud – bass guitar, double bass
 Larry Tolfree – drums, percussion

Technical
 Peter Green Splinter Group – producers
 Arthur Anderson – producer, engineer
 Richard "Occy" Oxley – engineer
 Monty Strikes – photography

References

2003 albums
Peter Green Splinter Group albums
Eagle Rock Records albums